Iňačovce is a village and municipality in Michalovce District in the Kosice Region of eastern Slovakia.

History
In historical records the village was first mentioned in 1417.

Geography
The village lies at an altitude of 103 metres and covers an area of 17.35 km².

Population 
The municipality has a population of 820 people (2020-12-31).

Genealogical resources

The records for genealogical research are available at the state archive "Statny Archiv in Presov, Slovakia"

 Roman Catholic church records (births/marriages/deaths): 1863-1926 (parish B)
 Greek Catholic church records (births/marriages/deaths): 1811-1898 (parish A)
 Reformated church records (births/marriages/deaths): 1747-1940 (parish B)

See also
 List of municipalities and towns in Slovakia

References

External links
https://web.archive.org/web/20071027094149/http://www.statistics.sk/mosmis/eng/run.html
Surnames of living people in Inacovce

Villages and municipalities in Michalovce District